The 2007–08 Milwaukee Panthers men's basketball team represented the University of Wisconsin–Milwaukee during the 2007–08 NCAA Division I men's basketball season. The Panthers, led by third-year head coach Rob Jeter, played their home games at the UW–Milwaukee Panther Arena as members of the Horizon League. They finished the season 14–16, 9–9 in Horizon League play to finish in fifth place. They lost in the first round of the Horizon League tournament to Loyola University Chicago.

Previous season
The Panthers finished the 2006–07 season 9–22, 6–10 in Horizon League play to finish in seventh place. They lost in the first round of the Horizon League tournament 77–83 against the University of Illinois Chicago.

Roster

Schedule and results 

|-
!colspan=9 style=| Regular season

|-
!colspan=9 style=|Horizon League tournament

References

Milwaukee Panthers men's basketball seasons
Milwaukee
Milwaukee
Milwaukee